The Maio wall gecko (Tarentola maioensis) is a species of geckos in the family Phyllodactylidae. The species is endemic to Cape Verde, where it occurs on the island of Maio. The species was named by Hans Hermann Schleich in 1984. The specific name maioensis refers to the island of Maio, the type locality.

Taxonomy
Previously a subspecies Tarentola rudis maioensis, it was elevated to species status in 2012.

References

Further reading
Schleich, 1984 : Die Geckos der Gattung Tarentola der Kapverden (Reptilia: Sauria: Gekkonidae) [Geckos of the Tarentola Species in Cape Verde]. Courier Forschungsinstitut Senckenberg, vol. 68, p. 95-106. 

maioensis
Geckos of Africa
Endemic vertebrates of Cape Verde
Fauna of Maio, Cape Verde
Reptiles described in 1984
Taxa named by Hans Hermann Schleich